The Brazilian currency has been renamed and redefined several times through its history. Since 1994, the official one is the Brazilian real (plural reais, with symbol R$ and ISO code BRL.

Historical currencies 

Note that the dates of various currencies overlap.  For example, the cruzeiro novo was still legal tender for 2 years after the second cruzeiro was introduced.

Not considering inflation, one modern Brazilian real is equivalent to 2,750,000,000,000,000,000 times the old real, that is,  (2.75 quintillion) réis.

Before leaving Brazil in 1821, the Portuguese royal court withdrew all the bullion currency it could from banks in exchange for what would become worthless bond notes;

Banknotes 

The following tables indicate what banknotes were present in each of the currencies of Brazil, except for the provisional issues of banknotes to exchange gold in the colonial period:

|-
! 0.01 !! 0.05 !! 0.10 !! 0.50 !! 1 !! 2 !! 5 !! 10 !! 20 !! 50 !! 100 !! 200 !! 500 !! 1,000 !! 2,000 !! 5,000 !! 10,000 !! 20,000 !! 30,000 !! 50,000 !! 100,000 !! 200,000 !! 500,000 !! 1,000,000 !! 5,000,000
|-
|  ||  ||  ||  ||  ||  ||  ||  ||  ||  ||  ||  ||  ||  ||  ||  ||  ||  ||  ||  ||  ||  ||  ||  || 
|-
|  ||  ||  ||  ||  ||  ||  ||  ||  ||  ||  ||  ||  ||  ||  ||  ||  ||  ||  ||  ||  ||  ||  ||  || 
|-
|  ||  ||  ||  ||  ||  ||  ||  ||  ||  ||  ||  ||  ||  ||  ||  ||  ||  ||  ||  ||  ||  ||  ||  || 
|-
|  ||  ||  ||  ||  ||  ||  ||  ||  ||  ||  ||  ||  ||  ||  ||  ||  ||  ||  ||  ||  ||  ||  ||  || 
|-
|  ||  ||  ||  ||  ||  ||  ||  ||  ||  ||  ||  ||  ||  ||  ||  ||  ||  ||  ||  ||  ||  ||  ||  || 
|-
|  ||  ||  ||  ||  ||  ||  ||  ||  ||  ||  ||  ||  ||  ||  ||  ||  ||  ||  ||  ||  ||  ||  ||  || 
|-
|  ||  ||  ||  ||  ||  ||  ||  ||  ||  ||  ||  ||  ||  ||  ||  ||  ||  ||  ||  ||  ||  ||  ||  || 
|-
|  ||  ||  ||  ||  ||  ||  ||  ||  ||  ||  ||  ||  ||  ||  ||  ||  ||  ||  ||  ||  ||  ||  ||  || 
|-
|  ||  ||  ||  ||  ||  ||  ||  ||  ||  ||  ||  ||  ||  ||  ||  ||  ||  ||  ||  ||  ||  ||  ||  || 

No single face value has been present in all historical Brazilian banknotes. For example, a face value of 100 is missing from the old real (as its lowest denomination of banknote is 500 Rs) and from the provisional cruzeiro novo (as its only banknotes were overstamps of the first cruzeiro, and the highest denomination was NCr$10). It is, however, present in all the other currencies:

Coins 
The following tables indicate what coins were present in each of the currencies of Brazil, with the exception of réis:

! 0.01 !! 0.02 !! 0.05 !! 0.10 !! 0.20 !! 0.25 !! 0.50 !! 1 !! 2 !! 3 !! 4 !! 5 !! 10 !! 20 !! 50 !! 100 !! 200 !! 300 !! 500 !! 1,000 !! 2,000 !! 5,000
|-
|  ||  ||  ||  ||  ||  ||  ||  ||  ||  ||  ||  ||  ||  ||  ||  ||  ||  ||  ||  ||  || 
|-
|  ||  ||  ||  ||  ||  ||  ||  ||  ||  ||  ||  ||  ||  ||  ||  ||  ||  ||  ||  ||  || 
|-
|  ||  ||  ||  ||  ||  ||  ||  ||  ||  ||  ||  ||  ||  ||  ||  ||  ||  ||  ||  ||  || 
|-
|  ||  ||  ||  ||  ||  ||  ||  ||  ||  ||  ||  ||  ||  ||  ||   ||  ||  ||  ||  ||  || 
|-
|  ||  ||  ||  ||  ||  ||  ||  ||  ||  ||  ||  ||  ||  ||  ||  ||  ||  ||  ||  ||  || 
|-
|  ||  ||  ||  ||  ||  ||  ||  ||  ||  ||  ||  ||  ||  ||  ||  ||  ||  ||  ||  ||  || 
|-
|  ||  ||  ||  ||  ||  ||  ||  ||  ||  ||  ||  ||  ||  ||  ||  ||  ||  ||  ||  ||  || 
|-
|  ||  ||  ||  ||  ||  ||  ||  ||  ||  ||  ||  ||  ||  ||  ||  ||  ||  ||  ||  ||  || 

No single face value has been present in all historical Brazilian coins. For example, a face value of 1 is missing from the cruzeiro novo (as its highest denomination of coin is NCr$0.50 because it's a transitory monetary standard between the cruzeiro issued between 1942 and 1967 and the cruzeiro issued after 1970) and from the old real and the cruzeiro real (as their lowest denomination of coin is 5 Rs and CR$5, respectively). It is, however, present in all the other currencies:

Notes

References 

Historical currencies of Brazil